Grand Haven Area Public Schools is a Michigan school district that encompasses a 100-square-mile area that includes the cities of Grand Haven and Ferrysburg, as well as Grand Haven Charter Township and portions of the townships of Spring Lake, Port Sheldon, and Robinson in Ottawa County.  It also includes a small portion of the southernmost area of the city of Norton Shores located in Muskegon County. The district includes seven elementary buildings, two middle schools (5-6 and 7–8), and two high schools (9-12). The total K-12 enrollment is just over 6,000 students.
The schools are:
Ferry Elementary
Griffin Elementary
Lake Hills Elementary
Mary A White Elementary
Peach Plains Elementary
Robinson Elementary
Rosy Mound Elementary
Voyagers School
Lakeshore Middle School
White Pines Intermediate School
Central High School
Grand Haven High School
Educational Service Center

References

External links
 

School districts in Michigan
Education in Muskegon County, Michigan
Education in Ottawa County, Michigan